The 2015–16 Deportivo Saprissa season was the club's 81st season of existence, and the club's 67th season in the top tier of Costa Rican football. Saprissa played in the Costa Rican Primera División, as well as participated in the 2015 Costa Rican Cup, and the 2015–16 CONCACAF Champions League.

In the Primera División, Saprissa finished 2nd during the Invierno season and 3rd during the Verano season. In each season's tournament, Saprissa won the Invierno tournament and was eliminated in the semifinals of the Verano tournament. Saprissa was eliminated in the first round of the Costa Rican Cup and finished 2nd in their group of the Champions League, failing to reach the knockout stage.

Club

Competitions

Costa Rican FPD

Invierno

Table

First stage

Second stage

Semifinals

Finals

Verano

First stage

Second stage

Semifinals

Costa Rican Cup

CONCACAF Champions League

Group stage

Table

Results

References 

 
Deportivo Saprissa seasons